The Batman is an American animated television series based on the DC Comics superhero Batman. Developed by Michael Goguen and Duane Capizzi, and produced by Warner Bros. Animation, the series first aired on Kids' WB on September 11, 2004, then Cartoon Network on April 2, 2005. The show would become exclusive to the former network for its third, fourth, and fifth seasons in early 2006. The Batman won six Daytime Emmy Awards over the course of its run. Many elements from previous Batman storylines were borrowed and adapted, such as those from the comic books, film series and the animated shows like Batman: The Animated Series from the DC Animated Universe, but it remained strictly within its own distinct continuity. Jackie Chan Adventures artist Jeff Matsuda served as art director and provided the character designs. The production team altered the appearances of many of the comic books' supervillains for the show, such as the Joker, the Penguin, and the Riddler.

All five seasons are available on DVD. In 2005, a direct-to-DVD movie titled The Batman vs. Dracula was released. The Batman also received a spin-off comic book series, The Batman Strikes!, published by DC Comics; it was set in the same continuity as the show and featured the same art style.

Synopsis

The Batman, the costumed protector of Gotham City, is secretly billionaire playboy Bruce Wayne (voiced by Rino Romano). The series focuses on Batman's earlier years of his crime-fighting career, as he began fighting crime three years prior to the start of the series, and the Gotham City police do not publicly acknowledge the vigilante's existence. Operating out of a secret lair underneath Bruce Wayne's mansion—known as the Batcave—Batman and his butler, Alfred Pennyworth (voiced by Alastair Duncan), stop crime with the assistance of high-tech gadgets and a supercomputer.

Season 1
At the start of the first season, crime in Gotham is in decline, but Gotham Chief of Police Angel Rojas (voiced in the pilot by Edward James Olmos and later by Jesse Corti), orders his officers to hunt down Batman. This marks the first acknowledgment of Batman's existence in the series. Despite the chief's orders, one of his detectives, Ethan Bennett (voiced by Steven Harris), believes the city needs Batman. At the start of the series, Bennett is assisted by a new partner from Metropolis, Ellen Yin (voiced by Ming-Na), who slowly becomes torn between her commitment to law and order and her personal feelings toward Batman.

Throughout season 1, both Bennett and Yin are tasked with capturing Batman. During this first season, Bruce Wayne finds himself torn between his responsibilities as Batman and his regular life, though the latter is supported by Gotham's mayor, Marion Grange (voiced by Adam West who played Batman in the 1960s Batman TV series). By the end of the season, Bennett is tortured and mutated by the Joker, transforming Bennett into Clayface. As Clayface, he is forced into hiding, while his partner Yin finally realizes she was right about Batman and forms an alliance with him.

Among the villains introduced this season are the Joker (voiced by Kevin Michael Richardson), the Penguin (voiced by Tom Kenny), Catwoman (voiced by Gina Gershon), Mr. Freeze (voiced by Clancy Brown), Firefly (voiced by Jason Marsden), the Ventriloquist and Scarface (voiced by Dan Castellaneta), Man-Bat (voiced by Peter MacNicol), Cluemaster (voiced by Glenn Shadix), and Bane (voiced by Joaquim de Almeida in the first appearance, Ron Perlman in the second, and Clancy Brown in the third).

Season 2
Throughout the second season, Batman continues to act outside of the law even though he has Detective Yin as an ally. Batman begins making a name for himself as a force for good when he saves a group of policemen from certain doom. In this season, his heroic act prompts the officers to support him rather than pursue him as a criminal. In the season finale, Police Chief Rojas finally uncovers Yin's involvement with Batman, forcing her to go on the run. Around this time, Commissioner James Gordon (voiced by Mitch Pileggi), the main law enforcement figure in most of the Batman mythos, rejects Rojas' belief that Batman is a criminal. Commissioner Gordon instead believes Batman to be an ally of the Gotham police force and is particularly impressed when Batman and Yin capture the Joker, Penguin, and Riddler. He is revealed to be Batman's secret ally off-screen and develops a signaling searchlight, the Bat-Signal, allowing Batman to know that the police are firmly on his side.

This season introduces more villains, including Rag Doll (voiced by Jeff Bennett), the Riddler (voiced by Robert Englund), Killer Croc (voiced by Ron Perlman), Spellbinder (voiced by Michael Massee), and Solomon Grundy (voiced by Kevin Grevioux). Another new villain, Hugo Strange (initially voiced by Frank Gorshin, the original Riddler from the 1960s Batman TV series, who is later replaced by Richard Green after Gorshin's death), is portrayed as a secondary character in the season. The characters Yin and Police Chief Rojas make their final appearances at the end of the season.

Season 3
In the third season, the show introduces a younger incarnation of Barbara Gordon (voiced by Danielle Judovits), who is the police commissioner's daughter. Over the course of a two-part story, she secretly becomes Batgirl. The show's opening title sequence changes this season, and the opening theme music (performed by U2 guitarist The Edge) is substituted with a lighter, '60s theme performed by Andy Sturmer. Throughout season 3, Barbara tries to become Batman's sidekick and be as good of an ally as her father. However, Batman frequently refuses to accept her help, although she proves herself to him by the end of the season.

This Batman-Batgirl storyline differs from the comic books. In previous incarnations of the story, Batman's first partner is Dick Grayson, who becomes Robin and joins Batman as his apprentice, later leaving to become Nightwing. The decision for Batgirl to be Batman's first sidekick in The Batman was due to Robin not permitted to be used in the show due to him being used in the Teen Titans animated series, which aired on Cartoon Network and due to the Bat-embargo (a restriction in place regarding usage Batman's allies and enemies in multiple animated shows based on the comics). This season also sees the destruction of Batman's original Batmobile, which is replaced by an updated version for the remainder of the series.

Several more new villains from the Batman mythos are introduced this season, including Poison Ivy (voiced by Piera Coppola), a different version of Gearhead (voiced by Will Friedle), Maxie Zeus (voiced by Phil LaMarr), the Toymaker (voiced by Patton Oswalt), Prank (voiced by Michael Reisz), Temblor (voiced by Jim Cummings), and D.A.V.E. (voiced Jeff Bennett). Hugo Strange becomes a villain this season, having orchestrated the events of "A Fistful of Felt" and "Gotham's Ultimate Criminal Mastermind." The season finale concludes with his incarceration at Arkham Asylum.

Season 4

With the conclusion of Teen Titans in 2006, the fourth season introduces Dick Grayson (voiced by Evan Sabara). The opening episode of the season focuses on Dick Grayson's origins as Robin. Through the loss of Grayson's parents in a murder made to look like a circus accident, he is adopted by Bruce Wayne, who assists Grayson in bringing down the mafia boss responsible for his parents' deaths. The second episode in the season leads to Batgirl officially becoming part of the team, with each member divulging his or her secret identity to the others. This reveal eventually leads to Batgirl and Robin forming a sibling-like rivalry. One of the highlights of season 4 is the episode "Artifacts", which described a possible future in the year 3027. Featuring flashback scenes to 2027, the audience gets a glimpse of an older Batman, Dick Grayson operating as Nightwing (voiced by Jerry O'Connell), and Barbara Gordon, now reliant on a wheelchair and having become the Oracle (voiced by Kellie Martin). The episode also features elements from Frank Miller's The Dark Knight Returns, including the designs of both the Batman costume and the Batmobile. In the season finale, an alien invasion by entities called "The Joining" causes Batman to work alongside another superhero from the DC Universe and an original member of the Justice League, Martian Manhunter (voiced by Dorian Harewood), to thwart the aliens' plans. This is when Batman becomes part of the Justice League of America.

More villains with new interpretations are once again introduced, including Tony Zucco (voiced by Mark Hamill, who voiced the Joker in the DC animated universe), Killer Moth (voiced by Jeff Bennett), Black Mask (voiced by James Remar), Rumor (voiced by Ron Perlman), the Everywhere Man (voiced by Brandon Routh), Harley Quinn (voiced by Hynden Walch), and Francis Grey (voiced by Dave Foley). The season also brought an end to Ethan Bennett's version of Clayface, including a storyline that redeemed Bennett by curing him of his condition. This gave writers the opportunity to introduce Basil Karlo's version of the villain (voiced by Wallace Langham in the first appearance, and Lex Lang in the second appearance). Season 4 also featured a redesign of Bruce Wayne, with a more square facial and chin structure, making him reminiscent of the DC animated universe Batman design.

This was the final season worked on by Jeff Matsuda and Michael Jelenic, both of whom departed from the show after the season finale.

Season 5
The final season on The Batman, season 5, focused primarily on Batman and Robin, with the pair teaming up with some of the DC Universe's characters to battle different villains. These team-ups included Superman (voiced by George Newbern, reprising his role from Justice League and Justice League Unlimited), Martian Manhunter , Green Arrow (voiced by Chris Hardwick), the Flash (voiced by Charlie Schlatter, who previously voiced Flash in Superman: The Animated Series), Green Lantern (voiced by Dermot Mulroney), and Hawkman (voiced by Robert Patrick). Producer Alan Burnett described the season as the show's "The Brave and the Bold season". Both Batgirl and Commissioner Gordon were relegated to either guest or cameo appearances during the season, where Barbara Gordon, having graduated from high school, now attends college. The series finale (shown as a 40-minute movie) features all the members of the Justice League who made an appearance in the series, along with Batgirl, as they fight against a renewed effort of the Joining to invade Earth.

Most of the villains featured in the season are reinterpretations of those that fought against the DC heroes who teamed-up with Batman. These villains include Lex Luthor (voiced by Clancy Brown, reprising his role from the DC Animated Universe), Mercy Graves (voiced by Gwendoline Yeo), Metallo (voiced by Lex Lang), Count Vertigo (voiced by Greg Ellis), the Toyman (voiced by Richard Green), the Shadow Thief (voiced by Diedrich Bader), Sinestro (voiced by Miguel Ferrer), and the Mirror Master (voiced by John Larroquette). Only the Terrible Trio (voiced by David Faustino, Grey DeLisle, and Googy Gress), the Wrath (voiced by Christopher Gorham), and Phosphorus are reinterpretations of Batman villains. Phosphorus differs in the show from the comic version, in that Firefly mutates into him, giving him the same radioactive skills and incorporating Phosphorus's insanity, while the Terrible Trio mutated themselves and their victims into human-animal hybrids using a mutagen created by Doctor Kirk Langstrom.

Episodes

Home media
All of the DVD releases of The Batman are released by Warner Home Video (via DC Entertainment and Warner Bros. Family Entertainment) and presented in its original broadcast version and in story continuity order. The DVD releases of The Batman are also presented in a 4:3 fullscreen aspect ratio. However, the entire series is available in its original 16:9 widescreen aspect ratio on Amazon Video, Blu-ray, Google Play, HBO Max, and the Xbox Video Store. The first two seasons and The Batman vs. Dracula movie are available on iTunes in 16:9. On March 1, 2022, Warner Bros. Home Entertainment released the whole series on Blu-ray for the first time. The Batman vs. Dracula film is not included in the complete series Blu-ray release.
 The Complete First Season DVD (2 discs, episodes 1–13) (release date: February 7, 2006)
 The Complete Second Season DVD (2 discs, episodes 14–26) (release date: September 12, 2006)
 The Complete Third Season DVD (2 discs, episodes 27–39) (release date: April 10, 2007)
 The Complete Fourth Season DVD (2 discs, episodes 40–52) (release date: November 20, 2007)
 The Complete Fifth Season DVD (2 discs, episodes 53–65) (release date: July 8, 2008)
 The Complete Series  Blu-ray (6 discs, release date: March 1, 2022) the Batman vs Dracula film not included.
 The Batman vs. Dracula DVD (1 disc, feature-length animated movie) (release date: October 18, 2005)

The Batman Official Games

The Batman Plug and Play TV Video Game 
The Batman Plug and Play TV Video Game (a.k.a. Plug 'n Play) was released in 2004 by Jakks Pacific. It features The Batman tracking down notable villains from the show, including The Joker, Firefly, Mr. Freeze, Bane, and Penguin. The game comes with a custom The Batman controller which connects to a TV via RCA connectors.

The Batman: The CobbleBot Caper 
The Batman: The CobbleBot Caper is a Macromedia Flash Toonami game released on cartoonnetwork.com in 2005. The video game featured a series of levels involving a kidnapped scientist, with gameplay resembling that of the Jakks Pacific's The Batman Plug and Play Video Game released in 2004, with a level in CobbleBot Manor being almost an exact replica of a similar level in the TV Game. The CobbleBot Caper features The Batman tracking down and fighting two notable villains from the show, Penguin and the Kabuki Girls. The game is no longer available on cartoonnetwork.com.

The Batman Strikes!
The Batman Strikes! is a DC comic book series featuring Batman and is a spin-off comic book series of The Batman. Part of DC's line for young readers, the series lasted 50 issues in total, with the last issue shipping in October 2008.

Collected editions

Crew

 Michael Goguen – Supervising producer
 Duane Capizzi – Supervising producer
 Glen Murakami – Producer
 Jeff Matsuda – Producer
 Linda M. Steiner – Producer
 Sander Schwartz – Executive producer
 Alan Burnett – Executive producer
 Kimberly A. Smith – Associate producer
 Sam Liu – Director
 Brandon Vietti – Director
 Seung Eun Kim – Director
 Michael Hack – Casting director
 Ginny McSwain – Casting director
 Andrea Romano – Casting director (seasons 4–5)
 Ginny McSwain – Voice director (seasons 1–3)
 Andrea Romano – Voice director (seasons 4–5)
 The Edge – Theme music creator

Awards

The Batman received Annie Award nominations for Best Animated Television Production in 2005 and 2006, and for Best Music in a Television Production in 2006.

The Batman was nominated for 12 Daytime Emmy Awards during its five-year run, with a total of six wins.

In 2005, it was nominated for Outstanding Special Class Animated Program, an Outstanding Performer in an Animated Program (Kevin Michael Richardson as the Joker), Outstanding Achievement in Music Direction and Composition, and Outstanding Achievement in Sound Editing – Live Action and Animation (for which it won).

In 2006, it was nominated and won Outstanding Special Class Animated Program and Outstanding Achievement in Sound Editing – Live Action and Animation.

In 2007, it was nominated for Outstanding Special Class Animated Program and won Outstanding Achievement in Sound Editing – Live Action and Animation.

In 2008, it was nominated for Outstanding Special Class Animated Program and Outstanding Performer in an Animated Program (Kevin Michael Richardson as the Joker), and won Outstanding Achievement in Sound Editing – Live Action and Animation, and Outstanding Achievement in Sound Mixing – Live Action and Animation.

The Batman was also nominated for Motion Picture Sound Editors "Golden Reel Awards" for Sound Effects Editing in 2005, 2008, and 2009, winning in 2008.

Reception
The Batman received a mostly favorable response from fans and critics (7.3/10 IMDb), with praise aimed at the modernized take on the classic Batman comic book mythos, the unique and interesting twists to the characters, and the performances of the voice cast, such as Rino Romano's portrayal of Bruce Wayne/Batman. However, the show never won over diehard fans the way the earlier animated series did, with criticism leveled on the odd character designs, deviations from the Batman mythos and animation style. Nevertheless, The Batman was a critical and commercial success and popular enough to last for five seasons.

See also
 The Batman vs. Dracula
 Batman: The Animated Series
 The New Batman Adventures

References

External links
DC page: TV series, comic

The Batman at WarnerBros.com
The Batman at The World's Finest
The Batman at Legions of Gotham
The Batman at Batman: Yesterday, Today, & Beyond
The Batman at BATMAN-ON-FILM.COM
The Batman (TV Series) from DC Wikia

 
2000s American animated television series
2004 American television series debuts
2008 American television series endings
American children's animated action television series
American children's animated adventure television series
American children's animated mystery television series
American children's animated superhero television series
American children's animated science fiction television series
Animated Batman television series
Animated Justice League television series
Animated television shows based on DC Comics
CW4Kids original programming
Daytime Emmy Award for Outstanding Animated Program winners
English-language television shows
Kids' WB original shows
Television series by Warner Bros. Animation
The CW original programming
The WB original programming
Toonami
Works by Christopher Yost
Cartoon Network original programming